Santa Maria Maggiore is a church in Gazzo Veronese, a village near Verona, in the Veneto region of northern Italy.

The church is first mentioned in the 9th century; an inscription on the exterior dates its consecration to August 20, 846. In 1117, an earthquake destroyed the first church, which was rebuilt in Romanesque style. During restorations in 1938-1940, 9th century mosaics were discovered under the current pavement.

Another extensive restoration was carried on in the 15th century. The exterior pinnacles date from this period.

Notes

9th-century churches in Italy
12th-century Roman Catholic church buildings in Italy
Churches in the province of Verona
Romanesque architecture in Veneto